Lakheri is a town and municipality in Bundi district in the Indian state of Rajasthan. Lakheri has been a subdivision headquarters since 2002. Yugantar Sharma (RAS) is the Sub-division Officer and magistrate of Lakheri subdivision. It is the second largest city in the district, after Bundi and 104th largest city in rajasthan.

Surrounded mostly by agricultural lands and villages, the most distinct feature of Lakheri is a cement manufacturing unit of Associated Cement Companies Ltd. (ACC). This plant is the longest-running cement plant in Asia having opened in 1912–1913. With the passage of time the plant has undergone expansions to incorporate the latest technology in cement production.

The latest expansion project was completed in April 2007. The managing director of ACC, in an interview with a private news channel, has predicted a 12–15% rise in cement production from the Lakheri plant.

Geography
It is located in southeast Rajsthan, a region widely known as Hadoti, the land of the Hadas. The River Mej passes through outskirts of Lakheri, and serves as the main water source for the city. Lakheri has fertile land and greenery with irrigation supplied through a series of canals. The city is surrounded on three sides by small hills of Vidhyan range. There is a water pump house on the River Mej with a capacity of 3240 kilolitres per day built by Lakheri's cement works ACC Limited. The Mej dam is also on the river near Lakheri. A small water reservoir and a zigzag dam has been constructed to store rainwater in the town. 

Apart from these, there is a small pond named Mahesh Sagar located in the town.

Climate

Lakheri has a semi-arid climate (Köppen climate classification BSh) with high temperatures throughout the year. Summers are long, hot, and dry, beginning in late March and lasting until the end of June. The temperatures average above  in May and June and frequently exceed ; temperatures as high as  have been recorded. The monsoon season follows with comparatively lower temperatures, but higher humidity and frequent, torrential downpours. The monsoons subside in October and temperatures rise again. The brief, mild winter starts in late November and lasts until the last week of February. This can be considered the best time to visit Lakheri because of the intense heat in the summer.

Most of the rainfall can be attributed to the southwest monsoon, which has begins around the last week of June and may last until mid-September. Pre-monsoon showers begin towards the middle of June with post-monsoon rains occasionally occurring in October. The winter is largely dry, although some rainfall does occur as a result of the Western Disturbance passing over the region.

Demographics
, Lakheri had a population of 29,572. Males numbered 15,222 (51%), females 14,350 (49%). Lakheri had an average literacy rate of 76.87%, higher than the state average of 66.11%: male literacy was 89.8%, and female literacy was 63.265%. In Lakheri, 13% of the population (3,844) was under six years of age.

Harauti, a dialect of Rajasthani is widely spoken in Lakheri, with Hindi and English being the other languages spoken.

According to the 2011 census, Hinduism is the majority religion in the city practised by about 83.2% of the population. Muslims form large minorities (14.07%) followed by Jains (1.34%), Sikhs (0.9%) and Christians (0.4%).

Transportation
The city lies in between the main Delhi - Mumbai line. More than 1000 travelers commute daily from Lakheri to Kota, Jaipur and many other large cities by local train like Dehradun express, Avadh express, Firozpur janta express train. The city was previously bypassed by Indian Railway, which did not provide any passenger train stops. Gradually, train stops have been added, such as Kota Shriganganagar SF, Jodhpur Indore SF, but continuous urge for stoppage of dayodaya SF and jaipur-mumbai SF has been neglected by Railway Board.

City is also connected to Bundi through SH29 and to Kota and Jaipur through SH1. Bus service in the city is in poor condition as Rajasthan Roadways has no routine bus service and no express, silver line or blue line buses. Two couple of buses one from kota and one from baran to jaipur passes through the town. Although private travellers' buses between indergarh and kota comes every half an hour.

City is looking forward for development as the bharatmala project Delhi-Mumbai route is planned to pass through outskirt of lakheri.

Health services
There is a shortage of medical facilities in the city, except for the presence of the following:

 Government community health centre
 ACC hospital
 Saxena nursing home
 Other private practitioners

Education
The government and private schools in the city are affiliated with either the Central Board of Secondary Education or Board of Secondary Education, Rajasthan and follow a 10+2 plan. The medium of instruction is either English or Hindi. Kota, the zonal headquarters near Lakheri is known as an education city.

In the past decade the city of Kota has emerged as a popular coaching destination for competitive examspreparation and for-profit educational services. The education sector of Kota has become a major contributor to the city's economy. Kota is popularly referred to as "the coaching capital of India". Over 1.5 lakh students from all over the country flock every year to the city to preparation for various exams such as Indian Institutes of Technology (IIT)-Joint Entrance Examination (JEE), the National Eligibility and Entrance Test (NEET-UG) and AIIMS etc. Many hostels and PGs for students are located in Kota in the vicinity of the coaching centres. Students live here for 2–3 years and prepare for their exams. In the past few years, reports of students committing suicide in the city have increased. According to these reports, students feel stressed and are pressured to crack their target competitive exam. To help students cope, many coaching centres have appointed counselors to help them.

College
 Maharaja Moolsingh College, Lakheri

Schools in Lakheri 

 ACC Works School
Govt. Sr.Sec. School
Govt. Girls Sr. Sec. School
Modern Public School, Nayapura
Shiv Bal Vidya Mandir Sec. School
 Adarsh Vidhya Mandir
Blue Bird Public Sec. School
Pathan Public School
Sharda Sec. School
Govt.Sec. School, Station
Govt.Girls Sec. School, Ishwar Nagar
New Nehru Children School, Lakheri Gandhipurai
DAV Public School
Swami Vivekanand Sec. School, Ganeshpura Lakheri
Saini Public School

Lakheri Movie Makers
LAKHERI MOVIE MAKERS is a videography and video editing production founded by lakheri based boys Pawan Sharma and Abhinav Meena in year 2014. In year 2017 Lakheri Movie Makers made a documentary LAKHERI DARSHAN which was a social attempt to avail the natural, religious, historical tourism spots and industries of town Lakheri. Lakheri Darshan was directed by Pawan Sharma and the facts regarding documentary was obtained from related persons, internet and book Lakheri Picchaley Panney.

Places of interest around Lakheri

 Lakdeshwar Mahadev Temple
 Raghunath Temple
 Charbhuja Temple
Chamawali Mata Temple
Sandal Ke Balaji
JANKINATH Astal
Bhoomia Ji Maharaj
CNI Church
Dungar Wale Baba
Sakhawada
ZIGZAG Dam
Sukhadia Park
Toran Ki Bawdi
manduppa balaji
Indergarh Fort

References

Cities and towns in Bundi district